is a retired long-distance runner from Japan, who represented his native country at the 1984 Summer Olympics in Los Angeles, California. He won the 1976 edition of the Košice Peace Marathon in Czechoslovakia. His twin brother  is also a retired Olympic marathoner.

He trained 2016 Olympics marathon runner Satoru Sasaki and runs the marathon program for the Japan Association of Athletics Federations.

His PR in the marathon was 2:08:55 at the 1983 Tokyo Marathon, finishing second, 17 seconds behind fellow Japanese runner 
Toshihiko Seko.

Achievements

References

External links
 1980 Year Ranking
 sports-reference

1953 births
Living people
Sportspeople from Ōita Prefecture
Japanese male long-distance runners
Japanese male marathon runners
Olympic male marathon runners
Olympic athletes of Japan
Athletes (track and field) at the 1984 Summer Olympics
Japan Championships in Athletics winners
Japanese twins
Twin sportspeople
Identical twins